This is a list of universities in Sudan.

Sources

 
Universities
Sudan
Sudan